Story station is a planned Santa Clara Valley Transportation Authority (VTA) light rail station in San Jose, California. It is proposed as an elevated station located on Capitol Expressway at Story Road.

The VTA light rail Orange Line is planned to be extended to the Eastridge Transit Center from its current terminus at the Alum Rock Transit Center, with Story station being the intermediate stop. This is part of the Eastridge to BART Regional Connector Project. The extension would offer rail connection to the Milpitas Transit Center and the Mountain View Transit Center, providing access to Bay Area Rapid Transit (BART) and Caltrain. After utility relocation for the project is complete in September 2022, construction would commence in Winter 2023 and revenue service is expected to begin in 2027.

References

Transportation in San Jose, California
Railway stations scheduled to open in 2027
Buildings and structures in San Jose, California
Santa Clara Valley Transportation Authority light rail stations